The women's shot put at the 2017 Asian Athletics Championships was held on 6 July.

Results

References
Results

Shot
Shot put at the Asian Athletics Championships